is the second studio album by Japanese rock band Asian Kung-Fu Generation, released on October 20, 2004.

Release 
Upon its debut, the album topped the Oricon charts for two weeks straight and produced four singles, with sales reaching over 600,000 copies by its third week. Its success can be partially traced to two tracks that the band produced, "Rewrite" and "Haruka Kanata," were featured in the opening themes of the highly popular anime series Fullmetal Alchemist and Naruto respectively. In 2016, the 2016 version of "Re:Re:" was used as the opening for the anime adaptation of Erased. With the LP, AKG also finally succeeded in outreaching to international audiences, a goal they had attempted in earlier English indie releases but were met by little response .

The album peaked at number three on the World Chart while "Rewrite" went on to win Best Anime Theme Song at the 2007 American Anime Awards. Following its domestic release, fans from around the world petitioned for Sol-fa to be distributed outside Japan. The support for Ajikan eventually resulted in Tofu Records striking a contract to release Sol-fa in the United States on October 18, 2005.

Reception
With the LP, AKG fully realized and honed the upbeat tempo but hard-edged and emotionally charged sound first expressed within Hōkai Amplifier. The urgency of the songs were complemented by the balanced nature of the overall album, creating their most mature release as of late. Gotō credited this outcome as the result of sharing his songwriting duties more evenly with bandmates than ever before. The album was equally praised for its high production quality, which thoroughly nullified the language barrier that frequently impeded non–Japanese speaking audiences. In 2020, Jonathan McNamara of The Japan Times listed Sol-fa as one of the 10 Japanese albums worthy of inclusion on Rolling Stone'''s 2020 list of the 500 greatest albums of all time, billing it as "an album full of tracks as well produced as they are sonically complex."

 Track listing 

B-sides

Sol-fa 2016

In 2016, Asian Kung-fu Generation re-recorded Sol-fa and released it on November 30, 2016. "Re:Re:" was released as the lead single on March 16, 2016. The tracklist changed with "Loop & Loop" as the third track and made "Kaigan Dōri" the closer for the album. This was the original track order that the band wanted for the original album, but they decided not to as they thought it would be bad to have all the singles in the first half of the album.

Track listing

Personnel
Masafumi Gotoh – lead vocals, guitar
Kensuke Kita – lead guitar, background vocals
Takahiro Yamada –  bass, background vocals
Kiyoshi Ijichi – drums
Asian Kung-Fu Generation – producer
Michihiko Nakayama – executive producer
Rieko Ohkura – production coordination
Fumihito Yokono – drum technician
Kenichi Nakamura – engineering
Toru Takayama – engineering, mixing
Stephen Marcussen – mastering
Stewart Whitmore – editing
Yusuke Nakamura – art direction

Chart positions
Sol-fa
Album

Singles

Sol-fa 2016
Album

Singles

References

External links
 CDJapan Sol-fa at MusicBrainz
 Sol-fa'' at Last.fm

Asian Kung-Fu Generation albums
2004 albums
Japanese-language albums
Sony Music albums